In computing, firmware is a specific class of computer software that provides the low-level control for a device's specific hardware. Firmware, such as the BIOS of a personal computer, may contain basic functions of a device, and may provide hardware abstraction services to higher-level software such as operating systems. For less complex devices, firmware may act as the device's complete operating system, performing all control, monitoring and data manipulation functions. Typical examples of devices containing firmware are embedded systems (running embedded software), home and personal-use appliances, computers, and computer peripherals.

Firmware is held in non-volatile memory devices such as ROM, EPROM, EEPROM, and flash memory. Updating firmware requires ROM integrated circuits to be physically replaced, or EPROM or flash memory to be reprogrammed through a special procedure. Some firmware memory devices are permanently installed and cannot be changed after manufacture. Common reasons for updating firmware include fixing bugs or adding features.

History and etymology 
Ascher Opler coined the term firmware in a 1967 Datamation article, as an intermediary term between "hardware" and "software".
In this article, Opler was referring to a new kind of computer program that had a different practical and psychological purpose from traditional programs from the user's perspective. 

As computers began to increase in complexity, it became clear that various programs needed to first be initiated and run to provide a consistent environment necessary for running more complex programs at the user's discretion. This required programming the computer to run those programs automatically. Furthermore, as companies, universities, and marketers wanted to sell computers to laypeople with little technical knowledge, greater automation became necessary to allow a lay-user to easily run programs for practical purposes. This gave rise to a kind of software that a user would not consciously run, and it led to software that a lay user wouldn't even know about.

Originally, it meant the contents of a writable control store (a small specialized high-speed memory), containing microcode that defined and implemented the computer's instruction set, and that could be reloaded to specialize or modify the instructions that the central processing unit (CPU) could execute. As originally used, firmware contrasted with hardware (the CPU itself) and software (normal instructions executing on a CPU). It was not composed of CPU machine instructions, but of lower-level microcode involved in the implementation of machine instructions. It existed on the boundary between hardware and software; thus the name firmware. Over time, popular usage extended the word firmware to denote any computer program that is tightly linked to hardware, including BIOS on PCs, boot firmware on smartphones, computer peripherals, or the control systems on simple consumer electronic devices such as microwave ovens, remote controls.

Applications

Computers 

In some respects, the various firmware components are as important as the operating system in a working computer. However, unlike most modern operating systems, firmware rarely has a well-evolved automatic mechanism of updating itself to fix any functionality issues detected after shipping the unit.

The BIOS may be manually updated by a user via a small utility program. In contrast, firmware in mass storage devices (hard-disk drives, optical disc drives, flash memory storage e.g. solid state drive) is less frequently updated, even when flash memory (rather than ROM, EEPROM) storage is used for the firmware.

Most computer peripherals are themselves special-purpose computers. Devices such as printers, scanners, webcams, and USB flash drives have internally-stored firmware; some devices may also permit field upgrading of their firmware.

Other instances of computer firmware include:
 The (U)EFI-compliant firmware used on Itanium systems, Intel-based Macs, and many newer PCs
 Hard disk drive, solid-state drive or optical disc drive firmware
 Video BIOS of a graphics card
 Open Firmware, used in SPARC-based computers from Sun Microsystems and Oracle Corporation, PowerPC-based computers from Apple, and computers from Genesi
 ARCS, used in computers from Silicon Graphics
 Kickstart, used in the Amiga line of computers (POST, hardware init + Plug and Play auto-configuration of peripherals, kernel, etc.)
 RTAS (Run-Time Abstraction Services), used in computers from IBM
 The Common Firmware Environment (CFE)

Home and personal-use products 
, most portable music players support firmware upgrades. Some companies use firmware updates to add new playable file formats (codecs). Other features that may change with firmware updates include the GUI or even the battery life. Most mobile phones have a firmware over the air firmware upgrade capability for much the same reasons; some may even be upgraded to enhance reception or sound quality.

Automobiles 
Since 1996, most automobiles have employed an on-board computer and various sensors to detect mechanical problems. , modern vehicles also employ computer-controlled anti-lock braking systems (ABS) and computer-operated transmission control units (TCUs). The driver can also get in-dash information while driving in this manner, such as real-time fuel economy and tire pressure readings. Local dealers can update most vehicle firmware.

Other examples 
Other firmware applications include:
 In home and personal-use products:
 Timing and control systems for washing machines
 Controlling sound and video attributes, as well as the channel list, in modern televisions
 In routers, switches, and firewalls:
 LibreCMC a 100% free software router distribution based on the Linux-libre kernel
 IPFire an open-source firewall/router distribution based on the Linux kernel
 fli4l an open-source firewall/router distribution based on the Linux kernel
 OpenWrt an open-source firewall/router distribution based on the Linux kernel
 m0n0wall an embedded firewall distribution of FreeBSD
 Proprietary firmware
 In NAS systems:
 NAS4Free an open-source NAS operating system based on FreeBSD
 Openfiler an open-source NAS operating system based on the Linux kernel
 Proprietary firmware
 Field-Programmable Gate Array (FPGA) code may be referred to as firmware

Flashing 
Flashing involves the overwriting of existing firmware or data, contained in EEPROM or flash memory module present in an electronic device, with new data. This can be done to upgrade a device or to change the provider of a service associated with the function of the device, such as changing from one mobile phone service provider to another or installing a new operating system. If firmware is upgradable, it is often done via a program from the provider, and will often allow the old firmware to be saved before upgrading so it can be reverted to if the process fails, or if the newer version performs worse. Free software replacements for vendor flashing tools have been developed, such as Flashrom.

Firmware hacking 

Sometimes, third parties develop an unofficial new or modified ("aftermarket") version of firmware to provide new features or to unlock hidden functionality; this is referred to as custom firmware. An example is Rockbox as a firmware replacement for portable media players. There are many homebrew projects for various devices, which often unlock general-purpose computing functionality in previously limited devices (e.g., running Doom on iPods).

Firmware hacks usually take advantage of the firmware update facility on many devices to install or run themselves. Some, however, must resort to exploits to run, because the manufacturer has attempted to lock the hardware to stop it from running unlicensed code.

Most firmware hacks are free software.

HDD firmware hacks 
The Moscow-based Kaspersky Lab discovered that a group of developers it refers to as the "Equation Group" has developed hard disk drive firmware modifications for various drive models, containing a trojan horse that allows data to be stored on the drive in locations that will not be erased even if the drive is formatted or wiped.  Although the Kaspersky Lab report did not explicitly claim that this group is part of the United States National Security Agency (NSA), evidence obtained from the code of various Equation Group software suggests that they are part of the NSA.

Researchers from the Kaspersky Lab categorized the undertakings by Equation Group as the most advanced hacking operation ever uncovered, also documenting around 500 infections caused by the Equation Group in at least 42 countries.

Security risks 
Mark Shuttleworth, the founder of the company Canonical, which maintains the Ubuntu Linux distribution, has described proprietary firmware as a security risk, saying that "firmware on your device is the NSA's best friend" and calling firmware "a trojan horse of monumental proportions". He has asserted that low-quality, closed source firmware is a major threat to system security: "Your biggest mistake is to assume that the NSA is the only institution abusing this position of trust in fact, it's reasonable to assume that all firmware is a cesspool of insecurity, courtesy of incompetence of the highest degree from manufacturers, and competence of the highest degree from a very wide range of such agencies".  As a potential solution to this problem, he has called for declarative firmware, which would describe "hardware linkage and dependencies" and "should not include executable code". Firmware should be open-source so that the code can be checked and verified.

Custom firmware hacks have also focused on injecting malware into devices such as smartphones or USB devices. One such smartphone injection was demonstrated on the Symbian OS at MalCon, a hacker convention. A USB device firmware hack called BadUSB was presented at the Black Hat USA 2014 conference, demonstrating how a USB flash drive microcontroller can be reprogrammed to spoof various other device types to take control of a computer, exfiltrate data, or spy on the user. Other security researchers have worked further on how to exploit the principles behind BadUSB, releasing at the same time the source code of hacking tools that can be used to modify the behavior of different USB devices.

See also 

 Bootloader
 Computer hardware
 Coreboot
 Custom firmware
 Microcode
 Proprietary device driver
 Real-time operating system
 ROM image

References